The Feels is a 2017 dramedy film directed by Jenée LaMarque. Starring Constance Wu, Angela Trimbur, Josh Fadem, and LaMarque, the film follows a group of friends who set out on a lesbian bachelorette weekend.

Plot 
For the upcoming nuptials of Andi and Lu, a group of friends celebrate during bachelorette weekend. Under the influence of alcohol, Lu admits to everyone that she has never had an orgasm, to Andi's complete surprise and dismay. The fun weekend is derailed in unexpected ways, causing everyone to reflect on subjects such as trust, love, and their first orgasms.

Cast 
 Constance Wu as Andi / Bride
 Angela Trimbur as Lu / Bride
 Josh Fadem as Josh
 Jenée LaMarque as Nikki / Lu's sister
 Ever Mainard as Regular Helen
 Lauren Parks as Vivien
 Kárin Tatoyan as Kárin

Reception 
Variety critic Dennis Harvey called the film "uneven but pleasing", predicting a target audience following in LGBT circles, and modest mainstream success. He concluded that the film fell somewhat short as a drama, because it didn't reach the necessary depth of the characters, but that "as a comedy, The Feels has considerable sprightly appeal, although it could have used slightly more assertive visual packaging. The dialogue and scene rhythms have a nice, loose, improvisational feel, and Steph Zenee Perez's editing maintains a bright pace." Cinema365 also gave the film a mixed review: The critique found it refreshing to see lesbians given the front and center of a film, as "often Hollywood tends to give the lesbian community short shrift, relegating them to supporting roles or comedy relief. Very rarely are any films told from a lesbian point of view even in independent films as this one is." The review called upon mainstream audiences to view it, and not see it as a lesbian niche work. On the negative side, however, this review also found the drama of the film "manufactured rather than earned."

Womentainment, on the other hand, gave the films an enthusiastic, unreserved "go watch it now!". Reviewer Karina H. Adelgaard found all the characters likable, enjoyed the "lesbian drama", and especially commended the film for being a lesbian drama with a happy ending.

Awards

See also 

 List of LGBT-related films directed by women

References

External links 
 

2017 LGBT-related films
2017 films
2017 independent films
American comedy-drama films
2017 comedy-drama films
American LGBT-related films
Lesbian-related films
LGBT-related comedy-drama films
2010s English-language films
2010s American films